Matthew Coad may refer to:

Matthew Coad (athlete) (born 1975), New Zealand sprinter
Matthew Coad (footballer) (born 1984), English footballer